Ji Wei (纪 伟, Jǐ Wěi; born on 5 February 1984 in Tianjin) is a Chinese hurdler.

He won the silver medal at the 2007 Universiade. He represented his country at the 2008 Summer Olympics with Liu Xiang and Shi Dongpeng.

His personal best time is 13.40 seconds, achieved in September 2007 in Urumqi.

Competition record

References

Team China 2008 

1984 births
Living people
Athletes (track and field) at the 2008 Summer Olympics
Chinese male hurdlers
Olympic athletes of China
Universiade medalists in athletics (track and field)
Runners from Tianjin
Universiade silver medalists for China
Medalists at the 2007 Summer Universiade